FM La Boca (call sign LRL 331) is an Argentine radio station. The station began broadcasting from the Buenos Aires neighborhood of La Boca in 1986.

FM La Boca is known for being one of the first Argentine community radio stations.

References
A la vuelta de la esquina article from 1999 on La Nación (Argentina)
Medios especializados en la temática de la discapacidad on Buenos Aires City Hall ’s website

External links
FM La Boca's official website

Radio stations in Argentina
Radio stations established in 1986
Mass media in Buenos Aires
1986 establishments in Argentina